Benthophilus ctenolepidus is a species of goby widespread along the southern coasts of the Caspian Sea: in the Gorgansky Bay, also from Absheron to Astara at south.

References

Benthophilus
Fish of the Caspian Sea
Fish of Western Asia
Endemic fauna of the Caspian Sea
Taxa named by Karl Kessler
Fish described in 1877